The Gawler River is a river located in the Adelaide Plains district of the Mid North region in the Australian state of South Australia.

The district surrounding the river produces cereal crops and sheep for both meat and wool, as well as market gardens, almond orchards and vineyards.

Course and features
Formed by the confluence of the North Para and South Para Rivers in the town of Gawler, the river flows generally west onto the Adelaide Plains. The mouth is in the Adelaide International Bird Sanctuary National Park—Winaityinaityi Pangkara, which consists primarily of mangroves in the tidal flats as the river empties into Gulf St Vincent. The outflow represents the boundary between the suburbs of Port Gawler on the northern bank and Buckland Park on the southern bank. The river descends  over its  course.

Flooding
The Gawler is subject to periodic flood events and the cause of occasional flash flooding (during 1:10 to 1:50 year flood events). Major overtopping in large floods occurs along much of the river length. Significant flooding commences within Gawler township from both the North and South Para Rivers.

Angle Vale

Baker Road ford, Virginia

September 2016

See also

 Rivers of South Australia

References

Gawler River
Adelaide Plains
Mid North (South Australia)